Ilana Weaver, more commonly known by their stage name Invincible, is a Jewish, American-Israeli rapper born in Champaign, Illinois. They identify as gender-nonconforming, and use singular "they"/"them" pronouns. Weaver is an Anti-Zionist, and has frequently been involved in activism in support of the Palestinian people, including through their music.

At the age of 1, Invincible moved to Israel, returning to the United States at the age of 7. Upon their return to the USA, they first lived in Ann Arbor, Michigan, then moved to Detroit, Michigan. Invincible has been a member of the Anomalies crew since 1997. They have collaborated with Finale, Suheir Hammad, Marco Polo, Tunde Olaniran, and Waajeed of the Platinum Pied Pipers.

Life and career
Invincible's mother is Israeli, and their father is from St. Louis. Their first language was Hebrew; they learned English from hip-hop music as a child and stopped speaking Hebrew by age ten.

At 15, Invincible started performing at open mic nights and getting into Detroit's battle scene in its late-1990s heyday. Invincible's passion for activism was sparked when members of the Ku Klux Klan gathered and spoke at Ann Arbor's City Hall, which was down the street from their high school. Invincible was disgusted with what they heard, but felt they couldn't do anything about it.

In 2008, Invincible released their debut album, ShapeShifters, on Emergence, a record label they co-founded.

In 2010, Invincible performed at the Can A Sista Rock a Mic? festival in Washington, D.C. That same year, Invincible received attention after the music video for "Ropes" was banned on mtvU, MTV's college-targeted channel, after it was deemed "too problematic" because of its theme of suicide. The ban was later lifted.

Invincible's music reflects a deeply held belief in social justice expressed through narrative. Invincible's time is split between youth organizing with Detroit Summer's Live Arts Media Project, the US-Palestine Youth Solidarity Network, and touring.

References 

American people of Israeli descent
Jewish American musicians
Jewish rappers
People with non-binary gender identities
LGBT Jews
Living people
Year of birth missing (living people)
21st-century American rappers
LGBT rappers
LGBT people from Illinois
Non-binary musicians
Transgender Jews
People from Champaign, Illinois
Anti-Zionist Jews
21st-century American Jews